Július Holeš (18 March 1939 – 19 August 2021) was a Slovak footballer. He competed in the men's tournament at the 1968 Summer Olympics. Holeš died on 19 August 2021, at the age of 82.

References

External links
 

1939 births
2021 deaths
Slovak footballers
Czechoslovak footballers
Olympic footballers of Czechoslovakia
Footballers at the 1968 Summer Olympics
Sportspeople from Košice
Association football goalkeepers
FC Lokomotíva Košice players